Helena d'Abancourt de Franqueville (26 February 1874 in Vienna – 16 November 1942 in Krakow) was a Polish art historian, librarian, and translator, best remembered for her work as a historian at the National Museum, Kraków and a librarian at the Polish Academy of Arts and Sciences. She is also remembered for her translations of the works of Romain Rolland and Ivo Vojnović. She also contributed biographies of her family to the Polish Biographical Dictionary.

References 

1874 births
1942 deaths
Polish art historians
Polish historians
Polish librarians
Polish translators
Polish writers
Historians from the Austro-Hungarian Empire